Rodrigues is a  autonomous outer island of the Republic of Mauritius in the Indian Ocean, about  East of Mauritius. It is part of the Mascarene Islands, which include Mauritius and Réunion. Like Agaléga, Rodrigues is a constituent island of the Republic of Mauritius, under the Constitution of Mauritius and still remains, as explicitly defined by the same Constitution, part of the Sovereignty of Mauritius, together with the following islands “Agalega, Tromelin, Cargados Carajos (Saint Brandon), Chagos Archipelago (…) Diego Garcia and other islands included in the State of Mauritius''

Rodrigues is of volcanic origin and is surrounded by coral reef, and some tiny uninhabited islands lie just off its coast. The island used to be the tenth District of Mauritius; it gained autonomous status on 10 December 2002, and it is governed by the Rodrigues Regional Assembly. The capital of the island is Port Mathurin. The islands of Rodrigues, Agaléga and Saint Brandon form part of the larger territory of the Republic of Mauritius.

Its inhabitants are Mauritian citizens. , the island's population was about 41,669, according to Statistics Mauritius. Most of the inhabitants are of African descent. Its economy is based mainly on fishing, farming, handicraft and a developing tourism sector.

Etymology and history

The uninhabited island was named after the Portuguese explorer Diogo Rodrigues in February 1528. Many maps also describe it as Diego Roiz. From the 10th century, Arabs are known to have visited the Mascarene Islands. These are apparently corrupted transliterations or transcriptions of the Arabic  Diva Harab ("Desert Island"),  Diva Maghrebin ("Western Island") and  Diva Mashriq ("Eastern Island"). While the second clearly refers to Réunion, sources disagree about which of the other is Mauritius and which one Rodrigues, which are both to the east of Réunion and arranged in a somewhat stylised way on these maps. However, even in its original state, Rodrigues had some karst, while Mauritius even after suffering 500 years of deforestation can by no means be called "desert" even in a colloquial sense.

The island was located again in February 1507. Part of the fleet of Afonso de Albuquerque and Tristão da Cunha, Diogo Fernandes Pereira's Cirne spotted Réunion on 9 February after a cyclone diverted their course. The other two islands were subsequently rediscovered. The initial name was Diogo Fernandes; Domingo Froiz was given as a name some years later, and by 1528 it had been again renamed after the Portuguese navigator Dom Diogo Rodrigues and has remained so since. The orthography has been less stable at first, with the name being transcribed Diogo Rodríguez (Spanish maps), Diego Roiz, Diego Ruys (Dutch maps) (or even Diego Ruy's Island), Dygarroys or Bygarroys. Some early French sources called it Île Marianne.

Due to the island lying far off the beaten track of seafarers at that time, it received few visits. From 1601, the Dutch began visiting the island somewhat more regularly for fresh supplies of food. In 1691, the Huguenot François Leguat and seven companions landed on the island, intending to set up a farming colony of Protestant refugees. Farming was not successful, but there was an abundance of tortoises, turtles, birds, fish and other seafood.

During the 18th century, several attempts were made by the French to develop the island. African slaves (ancestors of the present population) were brought to Rodrigues to develop stock-breeding and farming. In 1735 a permanent French settlement was established, subordinated to Île Bourbon.

In 1809, after a brief battle with the French, British troops took possession of Rodrigues. After British occupation, slavery was eventually abolished in 1834.  By 1843, the population had declined to a low of 250.

In 1883, the eruption of the Indonesian volcano Krakatoa was heard at Rodrigues Island and it remains the furthest point, at almost , at which the explosion was heard. The sound was described as "the roar of heavy guns". Naval ships were ordered to investigate as it was feared the sound was due to a ship in distress firing its guns.

In September 1897, solo sailor Joshua Slocum spent eight days on the island. He would later write, "At Rodriguez one may now find every convenience for filling pure and wholesome water in any quantity. Governor Roberts having built a reservoir in the hills, above the village, and laid pipes to the jetty, where, at the time of my visit, there were five and a half feet at high tide. In former years well-water was used, and more or less sickness occurred from it. Beef may be had in any quantity on the island, and at a moderate price. Sweet potatoes were plentiful and cheap; the large sack of them that I bought there for about four shillings kept unusually well. I simply stored them in the sloop's dry hold. Of fruits, pomegranates were most plentiful; for two shillings I obtained a large sack of them, as many as a donkey could pack from the orchard, which, by the way, was planted by nature herself."

Early in 1968, HMS Cambrian, which had been on duties near Beira in east Africa concerning Ian Smith and his unilateral declaration of the independence of Rhodesia, was diverted to Rodrigues to quell a reported uprising by some of the populace. The uprising consisted of a number of individuals who had been arrested by the local authorities for breaking into a warehouse and appropriating a supply of sweet potatoes. Other locals went to the authorities and by violence released the arrested persons. At this point, it is believed that the authorities requested assistance which was provided by HMS Cambrian. On her early morning arrival, the ship's 4.5" guns were fired (with blanks, it is believed) and an armed landing party was provided. This resulted in the offenders being rounded up and imprisoned again.

Geography

Rodrigues is a volcanic island rising from a ridge along the edge of the Mascarene Plateau. The tectonically active Rodrigues Triple Point lies on the sea-floor nearby. Rodrigues is only 1.5 million years old, even if the plateau under the lagoon surrounding Rodrigues may be much more ancient than the island. Over time Rodrigues has developed a unique environment, including many endemic species.

The shape is that of a whale back with a central ridge and deep cut valleys. Rodrigues is the only Mascarene island with extensive limestone deposits and caves. A large fringing reef surrounds the island forming a lagoon within which lie eighteen small islets.

The coral reef of Rodrigues is of particular interest as it is self-seeding – it receives no coral zooplankton from elsewhere. This has led to an overall species-poor but highly adapted ecosystem. A species of coral, two species of Pomacentrus damselfish and many species of crustaceans are found only on Rodrigues' reefs.

Climate
The isolation and location of the island give a microclimate specific to Rodrigues, with two seasons. Rodrigues enjoys a mild tropical maritime climate with persistent trade winds blowing throughout the year. The temperature difference between summer and winter is 3.6 °C. January to March are the hottest months and August is the coolest month. The wettest month is February; September and October are the driest months. The climate is hotter and drier than in Mauritius. Cyclones may arise from November to April, and Rodrigues is more often hit than Mauritius.

Biodiversity

Rodrigues was characterised by endemic plant and animal species in abundance, but since the seventeenth century much of its biodiversity has been eradicated. The island was home to a now extinct endemic species of flightless bird, the Rodrigues solitaire (Pezophaps solitaria). An endemic species of bat, the Rodrigues flying fox, is currently listed as endangered on the IUCN Red List. There are two remaining endemic bird species: the Rodrigues fody and the Rodrigues warbler, both are listed as near threatened.

To restore some forest areas, Grande Montagne, Anse Quitor (with neighbouring François Leguat Giant Tortoise Reserve) and two islets, Île aux Sables and Île aux Cocos have been declared nature reserves (under the Forest and Reserves Act 1983). Endangered plants on the reserves include Zanthoxylum paniculatum, Polyscias rodriguesiana, Badula balfouriana, and Gouania leguatii.

Government and politics

The island of Rodrigues is a constituency of the Republic of Mauritius and is dependent on the latter. However, on 20 November 2001, the Mauritius National Assembly unanimously adopted two laws giving Rodrigues its autonomy, creating a decentralised government system. This new legislation has allowed the implementation of a regional assembly in Rodrigues constituting 18 members and an executive council headed by a Chief Commissioner. The council meets every week to make decisions, draw up laws and manage the budget. The Chief Commissioner has the main task of informing the Mauritian Prime Minister of the management of the island's concerns. The last election of the Rodriguan Regional Assembly was held on 27 February 2022. The Alliance (UPR/MIR/PSMD/FRP) party was the winner and obtained nine seats, while the Organisation du Peuple de Rodrigues (OPR) obtained eight. The President acts as head of state and the Chief Commissioner as head of government on Rodrigues. The current chief commissioner is Roussety Johnson and the Chief Executive of Rodrigues is Pierre Louis Jean Claude.

Electoral regions
The island includes six electoral regions: La Ferme (Region 1), Marechal (Region 2), Saint Gabriel (Region 3), Baie aux Huitres (Region 4), Port Mathurin (Region 5) and Grande Montagne (Region 6). Rodrigues Regional Assembly election are held every five years.

Zones
Rodrigues is divided into 14 municipalities or zones. For statistical purposes, the zones are further subdivided into a total of 182 localities. The zones have between a minimum of six localities (La Ferme) and maximum of 22 (the capital Port Mathurin).

Demographics
The population estimate (as of 18 November 2022) for the island of Rodrigues was 43,650. The main religion is Christianity, dominated by Roman Catholicism with small minorities of other Christian branches, as well as Jehovah's Witnesses, and there are also Hindus, Muslims and Buddhists. Most of the inhabitants are of African descent and there is a minority of mixed-race peoples, descendants of the first European settlers.

The main language is Rodriguan Creole, but English and French are most used as the languages of government administration, the courts and business. Rodriguan Creole is very similar to Mauritian Creole, though some words are pronounced differently. People born in Rodrigues island are called Rodriguans.

Education
The education system in Rodrigues is similar to that throughout the rest of Mauritius. The government provides free education to students up to the tertiary level.
Education is taught mainly in English.

Transportation
Rodrigues is served by Sir Gaëtan Duval Airport in Plane Corail, with regular flights to Sir Seewoosagur Ramgoolam International Airport in Plaisance.

Economy

The economy of Rodrigues is mostly dependent on Mauritius. The main sources of income and economic activity are tourism, fishing, agriculture (especially of onions, garlic and chilli), and animal rearing. The handicraft industry has proven to be beneficial to the economy of the island. However, the income derived from the export of sea products, cattle, and food crops is smaller than the costs of imported products, creating a deficit.
It has a special relationship with English-speaking countries, such as England in the United Kingdom, Australia and Ireland.

As of 2020, Gross National Income per capita was approximately $16,400.

Culture

Cultural awakening which occurred at the end of the 1970s allowed the construction and consolidation of the cultural identity of Rodrigues through the development of these various elements, which form the base of the culture of every nation: food, music, and crafts

Music and folklore
The traditional music of the island is known as Sega Tambour. The music has an accentuated beat, usually accompanied by an accordion, clapping and the use of improvised percussion instruments like bamboo. The folk dance music is similar to polkas, quadrilles, waltzes and Scottish reels.

Cuisine
Rodrigues cuisine consists of dishes from local products: fruit, vegetables, seafood (fish, octopus, crab, shrimp, lobster) and meat. National dishes include sausages with kreolinės, rougaille sauce, octopus with curry, kono-kono (a shellfish) salad and Rodrigues cake.

Sports
The most common sport in Rodrigues is association football. There are local competitions almost throughout the year and in specific competitions, the winning team travels to Mauritius for sport exchange. Volleyball is also popular. There is also a public swimming pool at Marechal, a village located in the center of the island, and a stadium at Camp Du Rois in the region of Port Mathurin.

Museum
In 2010 plans were developed by Bernard Eric Typhis Degtyarenko for a private museum on the island, centred on the restoration of the yacht Admiral Nevelskoi. The hull of the yacht, belonging to the Maritime State University in Vladivostok, Russia, had been found drifting off Rodrigues in 1997 and brought ashore.

Notes

References

External links

 

 
Outer Islands of Mauritius
States and territories established in 1968
Maritime history of Portugal
English-speaking countries and territories
Former Dutch colonies
Former French colonies
Volcanoes of Mauritius
Hotspot volcanoes
Miocene volcanism
Pliocene volcanism
Pleistocene volcanism
1809 establishments in the British Empire